Bertram Sidney Thomas (13 June 1892 – 27 December 1950) was an English diplomat and explorer who is the first documented Westerner to cross the Rub' al Khali (Empty Quarter). He was also a scientist who practiced craniofacial anthropometry.

Biography
Bertram Thomas was born in Pill near Bristol and educated at Trinity College, Cambridge.

After working for the Civil Service in the General Post Office, he served in Belgium during World War I. He was commissioned in the  Somerset Light Infantry in January 1916 and served in Mesopotamia (now Iraq) between 1916 and 1918. He worked as an Assistant Political Officer in this country from 1918 to 1922, and Assistant British Representative in Transjordan (now Jordan), from 1922 to 1924. He was appointed as Finance Minister and Wazir to Taimur bin Feisal, the Sultan of Muscat and Oman (now Oman), a post he held from 1925 to 1932. In this capacity, he undertook a number of expeditions into the desert, and became the first European to cross the Rub' al Khali from 1930 and 1931, a journey he recounted in Arabia Felix (1932), in which he described this desert's animals, inhabitants, and culture.

Besides Arabia Felix, Thomas wrote several other books, including The Arabs: The Epic Life Story of a People Who Have Left Their Deep Impress on the World (London: T. Butterworth, 1930; Garden City, New York: Doubleday, Doran and Co., Inc., 1937).

During World War II, Thomas headed the Middle East Centre for Arab Studies in Jerusalem, where British Army officers were taught Arabic language and culture.

He returned to England and died in the house in which he was born, in 1950.

Two species of Omani reptiles are named in his honor, Platyceps thomasi and Uromastyx thomasi.

Awards
He was awarded the OBE in 1920 and CMG in 1949. In 1932 he was also awarded the Livingstone Medal of the Royal Scottish Geographical Society. One of the Society's most prestigious awards, it is offered for outstanding service of a humanitarian nature with a clear geographical dimension.

Film about Bertram Thomas
A recent film called Crossing the Empty Quarter was created by the Anglo-Oman Society's Chairman, Richard Muir — the ex-Ambassador to Oman — from footage taken by Thomas on his journey, and photographs from the Library of the Oriental Institute in Cambridge.

Bibliography
Arabia Felix (1932)
The Arabs: The Epic Life Story of a People Who Have Left Their Deep Impress on the World (London: T. Butterworth, 1930; Garden City, New York: Doubleday, Doran and Co., Inc., 1937)

References 

1892 births
1950 deaths
Alumni of Trinity College, Cambridge
Civil servants in the General Post Office
British colonial political officers
English explorers
English travel writers
Explorers of Arabia
Explorers of Asia
People from North Somerset (district)
Somerset Light Infantry officers
British Army General List officers
British Army personnel of World War I
Recipients of the Cullum Geographical Medal